Glen Lake Community School (GLCS) is a public, coeducational K–12 school in Kasson Township, Leelanau County, Michigan. Located between Burdickville and Maple City, Glen Lake Community School serves most of southwest and central Leelanau County, and lies near the eponymous Glen Lake.

Most of the school district is in Leelanau County. Places in the district include Cedar, Empire, Glen Arbor, and Maple City. Townships in the district include Empire, Glen Arbor, Kasson, and parts of Centerville, Cleveland, and Solon. The district also includes a portion of Platte Township, Benzie County.

History 
The Glen Lake Community Schools District was established in 1958, consolidating the declining local school districts of Cedar, Empire, Glen Arbor, and Maple City.

Demographics 
The demographic breakdown of the 674 students enrolled in 2021–22 was:

 Male – 54.9%
 Female – 45.1%
 Native American/Alaskan – 0.3%
 Asian – 0.1%
 Black – 0.6%
 Hispanic – 2.1%
 Native Hawaiian/Pacific Islander – 0.2%
 White – 95.8%
 Multiracial – 1.0%

Additionally, 221 students (32.8%) were eligible for reduced-price or free lunch.

References

External links 
 Glen Lake Community School Website

Public K-12 schools in Michigan
Schools in Leelanau County, Michigan
1958 establishments in Michigan
Buildings and structures in Leelanau County, Michigan
Education in Benzie County, Michigan
Education in Leelanau County, Michigan
Educational institutions established in 1958